Anthony Renard Foxx (born April 30, 1971) is an American lawyer and politician who served as the United States Secretary of Transportation from 2013 to 2017. 
President Barack Obama nominated him in April 2013, and he was confirmed by a 100–0 vote in June 2013. Previously, he served as the Mayor of Charlotte, North Carolina, from 2009 to 2013. He is a member of the  Democratic Party. First elected to the Charlotte City Council in 2005, upon his 2009 mayoral victory he became the youngest mayor of Charlotte and the second African American mayor.

Early life
Foxx was born on April 30, 1971, in Charlotte, North Carolina. He was raised by his mother, Laura Foxx, and his grandparents, James and Mary Foxx, pursued education at Piedmont Open IB Middle School, and graduated from West Charlotte High School. He graduated from Davidson College, where he was the first African American student body president, in 1993.  Foxx majored in history, and went on to earn a J.D. from New York University School of Law in 1996.

Legal career
After law school, Foxx returned to Charlotte to work for a short time at the Smith, Helms, Mullis, and Moore law firm, and left to become a clerk for Judge Nathaniel R. Jones of the Sixth Circuit Court of Appeals in Cincinnati. Later he worked for the United States Department of Justice and the United States House of Representatives Judiciary Committee. In 2004, he was the campaign manager for Representative Mel Watt.

In 2001, he returned to Charlotte to work as a business litigator for Hunton & Williams.  While a member of the city council, he retained his position as a litigator at Hunton & Williams, switching to part-time status.

Political career

Municipal government
Foxx was first elected to the Charlotte City Council in 2005 to an at-large seat, and was re-elected in 2007. He won election as Charlotte's 54th and youngest mayor in 2009 and was re-elected in 2011; he became the city's first Democratic mayor since Harvey Gantt left office in 1987.

Upon becoming mayor, Foxx faced Charlotte's worst recession in more than 80 years. As the nation's second largest financial services center, the city lost more than 25,000 jobs in the recession. Foxx reformed the city's public safety pay plan and developed a demand-driven approach to workforce development that has become a national model. Foxx also announced the creation of more than 4,000 new jobs. He hosted a series of town hall meetings with unemployed workers, pushed for changes to the city's small business loan program, and pressed White House officials for economic recovery spending measures.

From a transportation perspective, Foxx helped salvage the city's largest single capital project: The Blue Line Extension, which was threatened by lower than anticipated sales tax revenue.

Secretary of Transportation
On April 29, 2013, President Barack Obama announced that he would nominate Foxx to the post of the Secretary of Transportation. On June 27, 2013, the Senate confirmed the nomination by a unanimous vote. Foxx resigned from his elected position as mayor to accept the federal appointment.

Foxx prepared and advocated for the Obama Administration's first surface transportation bill, the Grow America Act, in 2014, and worked to get its congressional incarnation, the FAST Act, passed. He consolidated the Department's financing programs and accelerated permitting policies. Foxx also put forth new rules governing the commercial use of drones, blueprinted a comprehensive national policy on autonomous vehicles, and launched the Department's first Smart City Challenge, engaging more than 70 cities to develop their own strategies to incorporate new technologies into their transportation networks.

Foxx was the designated survivor for the 2015 State of the Union Address on January 20, 2015.

Private sector career
Foxx joined Lyft in October 2018 as the company's chief policy officer. In that role, he advocated for California's Prop 22, which excluded gig workers from receiving benefits like minimum wage, health care and the right to organize that are afforded to employees. would exclude gig workers. He stepped down from the chief policy officer role in October 2021, but he remained with Lyft as a senior advisor.

Personal life
Foxx is married to Samara Ryder, who is also an attorney. They have a daughter and a son.

See also
List of African-American United States Cabinet members

References

External links
Secretary Foxx at USDOT

|-

|-

1971 births
21st-century American politicians
African-American mayors in North Carolina
African-American members of the Cabinet of the United States
Carnegie Mellon University faculty
Charlotte, North Carolina City Council members
Davidson College alumni
Living people
Mayors of Charlotte, North Carolina
New York University School of Law alumni
North Carolina Democrats
North Carolina lawyers
Obama administration cabinet members
United States Secretaries of Transportation
Lyft people
African-American city council members in North Carolina